Group 1 consisted of five teams entered into the European zone: Bosnia and Herzegovina, Croatia, Denmark, Greece, and Slovenia. These five teams competed on a home-and-away basis for two of the 15 spots in the final tournament allocated to the European zone, with the group's winner and runner-up claiming those spots.

Standings

Results

Notes

External links 
Group 1 Detailed Results at RSSSF

1
1996–97 in Bosnia and Herzegovina football
1997–98 in Bosnia and Herzegovina football
1996–97 in Croatian football
1997–98 in Croatian football
1996–97 in Danish football
1997–98 in Danish football
1996–97 in Greek football
1997–98 in Greek football
1996–97 in Slovenian football
1997–98 in Slovenian football
1995–96 in Greek football
1995–96 in Slovenian football